Kapuamakamaemalamaonalani Rachel-May Gomera-Stevens (born March 17, 1999), known as Kapuamakamae or simply Makamae Gomera-Stevens, is an American professional soccer player who plays as a midfielder for National Women's Soccer League (NWSL) club Houston Dash.

Club career 
Gomera-Stevens signed with the Houston Dash in 2021.

References

External links 
 Washington State profile
 
 

1999 births
Living people
Houston Dash players
Houston Dash draft picks
American women's soccer players
Women's association football midfielders
Washington State Cougars women's soccer players
National Women's Soccer League players
Soccer players from Hawaii
People from Honolulu County, Hawaii